L'inglesou is a Vodou loa who lives in the wild areas of Haiti and kills anyone who offends him.

Portrayal
He executes judgment on those who can't keep their word, including houngans and mamboes who can't keep the secrets of voodoo from the uninitiated. L'inglesou is feared and respected by all. He almost never comes in possession, but when he does, he must be served correctly; otherwise the houngan or mambo will be cruelly punished.

When L'inglesou comes in possession, he only eats glasses and razor blades and drinks warm bull blood. His color is red. He is syncretized with the Sacred Heart of Jesus. He likes sharp objects such as knives, scissors, barbed wire, razor blades, and, in general, anything that will rip or tear flesh.

References

Haitian Vodou gods